Kotturu Dhanadibbalu & Pandavula Guha is an ancient Buddhist site near Kotturu village of Rambilli mandal Visakhapatnam District of Andhra Pradesh. A post office is located at Kotturu Village with Pincode 531061

History
This is an ancient Buddhist remain site with a Maha Stupa and Remains of Vihara's along with a small portion of rock cut cave used by Buddhist monks during 1st century BC to 2nd century AD on the hilly forest area. It lies along the banks of River Sarada.

This place is locally known as "Dhanadibbalu".Still excavations are to be done by the archaeology department at this site to excavate the viharas and minor edicts. Small rock cisterns are present very near to the Maha stupa, which is at the entrance of the hillock and at a further distance one can see the ruined mounds of Vihara with scattered bricks. From there we can reach the rock-cut caves with small (nearly 5) portions (locally known as pandavula guha, due to the resemblance with the number of accommodation in the cave).

Many bricks of the stupa and vihara are presently used by the locals (ignorant about the importance of this heritage site and lack of vigilance). There is a fencing around the remains site presently and a garden is being maintained by the archaeology department with a sign board.

Geography
Kotturu Dhanadibbalu is nearly 8 km from Yelamanchili town towards Atchutapuram.

Gallery

References

Buildings and structures in Visakhapatnam district
Buddhist sites in Andhra Pradesh
Stupas in India